The 1959 Stanford Indians football team represented Stanford University in the 1959 NCAA University Division football season. The team was led by Jack Curtice in his second year. The team played their home games at Stanford Stadium in Stanford, California.

Schedule

Players drafted by the NFL

References

Stanford
Stanford Cardinal football seasons
Stanford Indians football